Winslow High School can refer to the following schools in the United States:
 Winslow High School (Arizona)
 Winslow High School (Indiana), defunct, merged in 1974
 Winslow High School (Maine)
 Winslow Township High School, New Jersey
 Winslow High School, fictional setting of the American television series Boston Public

See also
 Lena-Winslow High School, Lena, Illinois